The Carpenter 1 Fire was a large wildfire on Mount Charleston,  northwest of Las Vegas, Nevada. The fire began on July 1, 2013, near Pahrump, Nevada, before spreading eastward. Carpenter 1 was seen for miles across the Las Vegas metropolitan area, and was the largest fire to occur on Mount Charleston in decades. After eight weeks of battling the fire, Carpenter 1 was fully contained on August 18, 2013. This resulted in the evacuation of residents and closure of businesses and portions of the Spring Mountains National Recreation Area.
 The fire, stretching between  elevations, was fought by hundreds of firefighters and eight hotshot crews, as well as helicopters, fire engines, water tenders, and a DC-10 tanker plane. According to the National Interagency Fire Center, the Carpenter 1 fire was considered "the highest ranked priority fire in the nation" at the time of its occurrence. Evidence of the damage can still be seen on the South Loop Trail to Charleston Peak.

References

External links
 Map of burn area

2013 in Nevada
2013 wildfires
Spring Mountains
Wildfires in Nevada